Bootie Island is a small island in the Shire of Cook in Far North Queensland, Australia. It is part of the Cockburn Islands Group.

Geography 
It is around 2 hectares or 0.02 square km in size.

The island is north of Manley Islet and Buchen Rock within the Cockburn Reef, adjacent to Pollard Channel and the Sir Charles Hardy Islands.

History 
The island is believed to be named after John Bootie, a midshipman on the HMS Endeavour, who died at sea 4 February 1771 on the first voyage of exploration by James Cook to the eastern coast of Australia.

The island has been the site of a number of shipwrecks:
 Amelia Breillart. Brig, 162 tons.

Struck the north edge or Cockburn Reef, Queensland, 15 August 1861 but broke free, continued her voyage but next day leaked so badly she was abandoned.

 Florinda / Flounda. Schooner, 105 tons. Built Melbourne 1873. 
Forced on to a reef at the north-eastern end of Cockburn Island, Queensland, by adverse winds, sank, 9 June 1887

  Pioneer. Brig, 148 tons. Built 1850. 
Wrecked on the north-west point of Cockburn Reef, Qld, 30 May 1851. Crew rescued by barque Waverly  and taken on to Batavia. She had been chartered to search Port Essington and Torres Strait for the long missing Dr. Ludwig Leichhardt.

  Richard Bell. Brig. 
Ashore on Cockburn Reef, off the Queensland coast, 1833

 Undaunted. Ship, 1245 tons. 
Wrecked after striking a reef near Cockburn Island, Queensland, 4 September 1863. Crew and cargo rescued by barque Cornwallis

 William. Brig, 219 tons. Reg. Cape Town 22/1837, reg Sydney 21/1837, 19/1838, 29/1838. Lbd 84 x 21.5 x 17 ft. Master Henry Kreuger. 
From Sydney, wrecked on Cockburn Island reef, off Cape Grenville, Qld, 8 September 1838. She was in company with the ship Trusty, which assisted in attempting to get her off, with no success. The William was abandoned, the crew taken aboard Trusty.

References

Islands on the Great Barrier Reef
Shipwrecks in the Coral Sea
Shipwrecks of Queensland
Uninhabited islands of Australia
Islands of Far North Queensland